Mobile Legends: Bang Bang South East Asia Cup, often called as MSC, is an annual esports tournament for the mobile MOBA game Mobile Legends: Bang Bang in Southeast Asia. The tournament consists of different teams from different countries in Southeast Asia such as Malaysia, Philippines, Indonesia, Thailand, and Singapore (Since 2017), Vietnam, and  Myanmar (Since 2018), Cambodia, and Laos (Since 2019).

History

MSC 2017 
The first season of "ML (Mobile Legends) Southeast Asia Cup" (MSC) started in September 1, 2017 and was held at Jakarta, Indonesia. It is a 3-day event with 8 teams from 5 countries: Philippines, Malaysia, Cambodia, Singapore, and Indonesia, and a total prize pool of $100,000. IDONOTSLEEP (IDNS), an e-sports team based in Thailand were crowned as the champions. MSC 2017 used a qualification system in determining the finalists.

MSC 2018 

The second year of MSC took off on July 27–29, 2018 and was held again at Jakarta, Indonesia with a similar prize pool of $100,000. MSC 2018 did not use a qualification system but started inviting teams from countries with established Mobile Legends: Bang Bang Professional Leagues (MPL). 10 teams were invited from 7 countries: Indonesia, Philippines, Malaysia, Singapore, Myanmar, Thailand, and Vietnam. IDNS, a competing team, reported technical issues during the tournament where the game casts skills without player input. Moonton put out a notice for a rematch but took it down and no rematch occurred.Regardless of the technical difficulties, Aether Main - a Philippines based team, won the championship.

MSC 2019 

The third year of MSC 2019 was held at the Smart Araneta Coliseum in the Philippines from June 19–23, 2019. There were a total of 12 teams from 9 countries in Southeast Asia. The nine countries that took part were Indonesia, Malaysia, Singapore, the Philippines, Cambodia, Laos, Thailand, Myanmar and Vietnam with a total prize pool of US$120,000.
 Onic Esports - a team based in Indonesia were crowned as champions after defeating fellow Indonesian based team Louvre Esports in the Grand Finals. This marked the 1st MSC Champions title for the Indonesia.

MSC 2020 
On 11 May 2020, Moonton announced that the 2020 Mobile Legends: Bang Bang Southeast Asia Cup was officially canceled due to the ongoing COVID-19 pandemic. Moonton explained that due to international travel limitations, and local government regulations about COVID-19, the events were impossible to be held. Hereby, Moonton planned to conduct alternative esports events in each participating MSC country respectively.

MSC 2021 

The 2021 Mobile Legends: Bang Bang Southeast Asia Cup, would be held virtually from June 7–9, 2021 for the Group Stages, and from June 11–13, 2021 for the Playoffs. At the Grand Finals, two Philippines based teams, Blacklist International and Execration, reigned supreme and battled it out at for the title in the first best of 7 series ever in the history of Mobile Legends. The title went to Execration, winning $150,000 and gave the Philippines its 2nd MSC Champions title.

MSC 2022 

The 2022 Mobile Legends: Bang Bang Southeast Asia Cup was held in Kuala Lumpur, Malaysia from June 11 to 19, 2022. Twelve teams from nine countries participated in the championship with a total prize pool of $300,000. At the Grand Finals, RSG Philippines and RRQ Hoshi fought to win the entire championship. RSG Philippines swept RRQ Hoshi 4 to 0 and were deemed the Champions of the 2022 MSC (Mobile Legends: Bang Bang Southeast Asia Cup) and gave the Philippines its 3rd MSC Title, currently the most out of any country playing for MLBB.

Format 
Two teams from Mobile Legends: Bang Bang Professional Leagues (MPL) on different Southeast Asian countries are invited to MSC. For countries without MPL, local qualifiers are hosted. The tournaments start with a group stage where teams fight for the spot in the upper bracket through best of 3 round robin. Teams winning the best of 3 in the group stage get the spot for the upper bracket. The other two teams compete on play-ins where the winning team gets to the lower bracket and the losing team is eliminated. After the group stage is the tournament proper. Losing teams from the upper bracket are demoted to the lower bracket while losing teams from the lower bracket are eliminated. One finalist will come from each bracket and compete in the Grand Finals. From 2017 to 2019, the Grand Finals are played in best of 5, but since the 2021 version, it is played in best of 7.

Winners

Viewership 
Mobile Legends: Bang Bang Southeast Asia Cup is streamed live to Facebook Gaming and YouTube.

Participating Teams

MSC 2017 

References:

MSC 2018 

1 = Formerly known as Team nxl>

2 = Formerly known as IDNS SG

3 = Formerly known as Team Saiyan

4 = Played as Aether MainReferences:

MSC 2019 

References:

MSC 2021 

References:

MSC 2022 

1 = Laos, Thailand, Vietnam
Reference:

Results 

Notes

Performances by teams 
The first edition champion, IDONOTSLEEP (IDNS) from Thailand became the only team to be appeared in all editions of MSC. While Rex Regum Qeon (RRQ) from Indonesia, became the first and current only team to appear twice in Top Four during 2018 and 2022 edition. IDNS, Impunity, OverClockers, RSG Malaysia, and Falcon Esports became the only representative nation team to be appeared in Top Four for Thailand, Singapore, Vietnam, Malaysia, and Myanmar consecutively. Currently, there is not yet representative team from Cambodia and Laos to appear in Top Four since their both first appearance in 2019 edition.

The current champion is MPL Philippines Season 9 champion, RSG Philippines in 2022 edition. RSG Philippines becomes the champion after beating MPL Indonesia Season 9 champion, RRQ Hoshi with the score 4–0. They also the third team from Philippines to become the champion, after Aether Main in 2018 and Execration in 2021.

Notes
* Nation hosts.
1.  Includes result playing as Aether Main during 2018.
2.  Includes result playing as RRQ.O2 during 2018.

Performances by nations 
Indonesia became the first and current only nation to hold MSC more than once with twice, followed by Philippines and Malaysia both with once. With three different teams, Philippines became the first and only nation to win MSC more than once with thrice, followed by Thailand and Indonesia both with once. Teams from Philippines also have the highest Runners-up and Third place title with both thrice. Philippines along with Indonesia are the only nations to appear in the top four more than once, nine times and six times consecutively, followed by one time Champions title for Thailand, and one time Fourth place title for Singapore, Vietnam, Malaysia, and Myanmar.

Notes
* Hosts.

References

External links 
 MSC Official Website

Mobile Legends: Bang Bang competitions
Esports tournaments